"In My Blood" is the third single from American hard rock band Black Stone Cherry's third studio album Between the Devil and the Deep Blue Sea. It was released to digital media outlets in October 2011.

"That was one of those spur-of-the-moment songs," recalled singer Chris Robertson. "We wrote that entire song on acoustic guitars in fifteen minutes; two days before we started recording Between the Devil and the Deep Blue Sea. It's an honest representation of the feelings we have when we're on the road. Rock 'n' roll is in my blood. I pretty much sucked at everything else, so it's good that music worked out for me."

Music video
The video tells the story of a real U.S. Soldier, PFC Randy Hirneisen. It follows him as he returns from Afghanistan to Germany, and eventually to his home in Augusta, Georgia, where he is reunited with his wife and sees his two-month-old son for the first time.

Charts

Weekly charts

Year-end charts

References 

2011 songs
Black Stone Cherry songs
Songs written by Zac Maloy
Roadrunner Records singles
2011 singles